Disks large homolog 2 (DLG2) also known as channel-associated protein of synapse-110 (chapsyn-110) or postsynaptic density protein 93 (PSD-93) is a protein that in humans is encoded by the DLG2 gene.

Function 

Chapsyn-110/PSD-93 a member of the membrane-associated guanylate kinase (MAGUK) family. The protein forms a heterodimer with a related family member that may interact at postsynaptic sites to form a multimeric scaffold for the clustering of receptors, ion channels, and associated signaling proteins. Alternatively spliced transcript variants encoding distinct isoforms have been described but their full-length nature has yet to be completely determined.

Model organisms 

Model organisms have been used in the study of DLG2 function. A knockout mouse line, called Dlg2tm1Dsb was generated. Male and female animals underwent a standardized phenotypic screen to determine the effects of deletion. Twenty four tests were carried out on homozygous mutant mice and five significant abnormalities were observed. Both sexes had atypical indirect calorimetry and DEXA parameters. Females also had decreased body weight, decreased circulating HDL cholesterol levels, and increased susceptibility to bacterial infection.

Interactions 

DLG2 has been shown to interact with GRIN2B, KCNJ12.

References

Further reading 

 
 
 
 
 
 
 
 
 
 
 
 
 
 
 
 

Genes mutated in mice